Llano Largo is a corregimiento in Los Santos District, Los Santos Province, Panama with a population of 2,265 as of 2010. Its population as of 1990 was 1,715; its population as of 2000 was 2,003.

References

Corregimientos of Los Santos Province